The Joint Special Operations University (JSOU) is the designated agency within USSOCOM to conduct joint Special Operations Force (SOF) education and thus is tasked with and directed to provide relevant, realistic, leading-edge education opportunities to military and civilian special operations forces personnel around the world, located at MacDill Air Force Base, Florida, United States.

Capable of full-spectrum joint SOF focused instruction, JSOU provides cohesive education support to SOF personnel, and other non-SOF decision makers at intermediate and senior levels. The university conducts off-station tutorials and courses as well as video teleconferencing instruction to supported units worldwide.

JSOU Education
JSOU delivers unique SOF educational opportunities through residence and distance learning (and combined) courses. It also supports SOF curriculum within the service Professional Military Education schools both through liaisons and SOF chairs at most PME institutions. JSOU faculty are regularly called upon to teach SOF-related blocks of instruction at PME institutions across the country. Additionally, through their mobile training teams, they conduct educational events for countries all over the world on a wide range of subjects, including support to resistance, the strategic effects of SOF, and design.

References

External links 
 
 current course offerings

United States Joint Special Operations Command
Military education and training in the United States
Military schools
Military in Florida
Universities and colleges in Florida
Educational institutions established in 2000
2000 establishments in Florida